Visitors to the Dominican Republic must obtain a visa unless they come from one of the visa exempt countries.

Visa policy map

Visa exemption

Nationals of the following 108 countries and passport-issuing jurisdictions do not require a visa to enter the Dominican Republic for 90 days (longer stays may be requested with a fee):

The visa exemption also applies to holders of valid visas or resident cards of Canada, the European Union, the United Kingdom and the United States.

Holders of diplomatic, official or service passports of Argentina, Belize, Brazil, Chile, Colombia, Costa Rica, Ecuador, El Salvador, France, Guatemala, Honduras, Israel, Japan, Morocco, Nicaragua, Panama, Paraguay, Peru, Russia, South Korea, Switzerland, Taiwan, Trinidad and Tobago, Ukraine, Uruguay and Vietnam do not require a visa.

Visa exemption agreements for holders of diplomatic and service passports were signed with China in November 2018, with Serbia in December 2018, and with India in August 2019, but they are not yet in force.

Visas are not required for citizens of any country who were born in the Dominican Republic as per their travel document.

Tourist fee
Visitors are required to pay a tourist fee of US$10, except for:
citizens, residents or holders of visas of the Dominican Republic
diplomats accredited to the Dominican Republic
nationals of Argentina, Chile, Ecuador, Israel, Japan, Peru, South Korea or Uruguay
those arriving in a small private aircraft (up to 30,000 pounds and 12 passengers)

This fee was previously collected in the form of a tourist card on arrival, but from 25 April 2018, the card is no longer required from those arriving by air. Instead, the fee is charged with the airfare for all tickets issued outside the Dominican Republic. Visitors who were automatically charged the fee with the airfare but satisfy one of the exemptions may request a refund of this fee online, to be issued within 15 days on a credit card, check or local bank account.

Visitors who enter the Dominican Republic by land or sea (and are not exempt) are still required to purchase a tourist card on arrival, which costs US$10 or 10 EUR.

Reciprocity

Dominican Republic citizens can enter all of the countries whose citizens are granted permanent visa-free access to Dominican Republic without a visa except for the European Union, Albania, Andorra, Antigua and Barbuda (grants eVisa), Argentina, Australia, Bahamas, Bahrain (grants eVisa), Barbados, Bolivia (grants Visa on arrival), Bosnia and Herzegovina, Brunei, Canada, Chile, Costa Rica, Dominica, Fiji, Iceland, Jamaica, Kazakhstan, Kiribati, Kuwait, Liechtenstein, Macao (grants Visa on arrival), Marshall Islands, Mauritius (grants Visa on arrival), Mexico, Monaco, Montenegro, Namibia, Nauru, New Zealand, Nicaragua (grants Visa on arrival), North Macedonia, Norway, Panama, Papua New Guinea, Saint Kitts and Nevis, Saint Lucia, Saint Vincent and the Grenadines, San Marino, Serbia, South Africa, Suriname (grants eVisa), Switzerland, Thailand, Tonga, Turkey (grants eVisa), Tuvalu (grants Visa on arrival), Ukraine (grants eVisa), United Arab Emirates, United Kingdom, United States, Uruguay, Vanuatu and Vatican City.

Visitor statistics
Most visitors arriving to Dominican Republic were from the following areas of residence or countries of nationality:

See also

 Visa requirements for Dominican Republic citizens

References

External links
Ministry of Foreign Affairs of the Dominican Republic 
About the Tourist Card 
About the Dominican e-Ticket 

Dominican Republic
Foreign relations of the Dominican Republic